Rüzaphema is a village located in the Chümoukedima District of Nagaland, formerly in the Dimapur District.

Demographics
Rüzaphema is situated in the Chümoukedima District of Nagaland. As per the Population Census 2011, there are a total 327 households in Rüzaphema. The total population of Rüzaphema is 2396.

See also
Chümoukedima District

References

Villages in Chümoukedima district